How Do You Spell Heaven is the 25th album to be released by lo-fi band Guided By Voices. It was released on August 11, 2017.

It was recorded and mixed by Travis Harrison at Serious Business Music, NY, and Stillwater Lodge.

Track listing 
All tracks written by Robert Pollard, except "Pearly Gates Smoke Machine" by Doug Gillard & Pollard.
"The Birthday Democrats" – 2:30
"King 007" – 2:51
"Boy W" – 2:33
"Steppenwolf Mausoleum" – 3:21
"Cretinous Number Ones" – 1:45
"They Fall Silent" – 0:55
"Diver Dan" – 2:03
"How to Murder a Man (In 3 Acts)" – 2:43
"Pearly Gates Smoke Machine" – 4:02
"Tenth Century" – 2:37
"How Do You Spell Heaven" – 1:52
"Paper Cutz" – 2:36
"Low Flying Perfection" – 2:36
"Nothing Gets You Real" – 2:23
"Just to Show You" – 2:17

Personnel 
 Bobby Bare Jr. – guitar
 Doug Gillard – guitar
 Kevin March – drums
 Robert Pollard – vocals
 Mark Shue – bass guitar

References 

Guided by Voices albums
2017 albums